The Cardiobacteriaceae are a family of Pseudomonadota, given their own order. They are Gram-negative and rod-shaped, with diameters around 0.5 to 1.7 μm and lengths from 1–6 μm.

References

Gammaproteobacteria